Bretzfeld is a municipality in the Hohenlohe district, in Baden-Württemberg, Germany. There is an exit (Nr. 39) with the same name at the A6 motorway.

References

Hohenlohe (district)